Local elections took place in Parañaque on May 9, 2022  within the 2022 Philippine general election. Voters will elect for the elective local posts in the city: the mayor, vice mayor, two congressmen, and the 16 councilors, eight each in the two local legislative districts of Parañaque.

Background 
Mayor Edwin Olivarez was on third and final term. He ran as representative of city's first district, switched places with his brother, First District Representative Eric Olivarez, was also on third and final term. Olivarez was challenged by Baclaran Barangay Captain Julius Anthony "Jun" Zaide, who broke the long time rule of the Cailles family (Olivarez's allies) in Barangay Baclaran, as well as Kainos Breed Fellowship International founder Gerardo "Bishop Jherie" Mores and independents Rolando Aguilar and John Andrew Uy.

Vice Mayor Jose Enrico "Rico" Golez was on third and final term. He ran as councilor of the second district. His party nominated Second District Councilor Vincent Kenneth "Binky" Favis to run in his place. Favis faced his fellow councilors, Joan Villafuerte-Densing and Maritess "Tess" de Asis from first and second district respectively.

First District Representative Eric Olivarez was term-limited, and ran as mayor. He was replaced by Mayor Edwin Olivarez. Olivarez was challenged by Jayson Moral and Pedro Montano.

Second District Representative Myra Joy Tambunting won't ran for re-election. Her husband, former Representative Gustavo "Gus" Tambunting ran in her place. Tambunting was challenged by Josef Maganduga.

Candidates

Administration coalition

Other coalitions

Other parties

Independents

Results
Names written in bold-Italic are the re-elected incumbents while in italic are incumbents lost in elections.

For Mayor 
First District Rep. Eric Olivarez defeated his closest rival, Barangay Baclaran Chairman Julius Anthony "Jun" Zaide.

For Vice Mayor 
First District Councilor Joan Villafuerte-Densing defeated her fellow councilors Vincent Kenneth "Coach Binky" Favis and Maritess "Tess" De Asis.

For Representative

First District 
Mayor Edwin Olivarez defeated his opponents Jayson Moral and Pedro Montaño.

Second District 
Former Representative Gustavo "Gus" Tambunting, defeated his closest rival Atty. Josef Maganduga by a thin margin.

City Council Elections

First District 

|-bgcolor=black
|colspan=12|

2nd District

|-bgcolor=black
|colspan=12|

References 

2022 Philippine local elections
Elections in Parañaque
May 2022 events in the Philippines
2022 elections in Metro Manila